Since the Socceroos' first match in 1922, 29 players have scored a hat-trick (three or more goals in a single match). The first player to do so was George Smith in a win over New Zealand in 1933. Archie Thompson's thirteen goals in the 31–0 victory over American Samoa is the world record for most goals in a match.

Hat-tricks for Australia

Hat-tricks conceded by Australia

See also
List of A-League hat-tricks

Notes

 The result is presented with Australia's score first.

References

External links

Hat-tricks
hat-tricks
Australia
Australia